Heliophanus wesolowskae is a jumping spider species in the genus Heliophanus. It was first identified in 1997.

Etymology
The species name of Heliophanus wesolowskae is named after the Polish arachnologist Wanda Wesołowska.

Distribution
The spider is found in Central Asia and particularly in Kazakhstan and Kyrgyzstan.

References

Spiders of Central Asia
Fauna of Kyrgyzstan
Salticidae
Spiders described in 1997